Mohammad Sheikh (born 29 August 1980) is a former Kenyan cricketer who has played One-Day Internationals and first-class cricket for the Kenyan national side. He is a left-handed batsman and a slow left arm orthodox bowler.

Sheikh took part in the senior Cricket World Cup of 1999, while just eighteen and still at school, and, the following year, took part in the Under-19s Cricket World Cup. He has since visited England to play in Hertfordshire. Presently he is living in South Australia and plays for the Payneham Cricket Club.

Sheikh did not play any cricket since 2005.

References

1980 births
Living people
Cricketers from Nairobi
Kenyan cricketers
Kenya One Day International cricketers
Kenyan people of Indian descent